Mehran Highway (also known locally as Nawabshah–Kot Lalu–Kumb Road and officially as Highway 31) is a two-lane-wide, bidirectional, single carriageway, provincially maintained highway in Sindh that extends from Khairpur to Nawabshah. The route is generally rural, passing near several smaller towns including Daur and Bandhi in Shaheed Benazir Abad District and Kot Lalu, Pacca Chang, Karoondi, Sui Gas, and Ranipur in Khairpur District. The northern terminus merges with the N-5 National Highway at Ranipur while the southern terminus merges with N-305 National Highway at Zero Point Nawabshah.

History
Prior to reconstruction of the Mehran Highway, the route was known as Kumb–Nawabshah Road. Reconstruction of the road had been pending for several years due to red tapism, causing accidents and diseases due to incomplete sections of the road where dust rising after passing of vehicles would also destroy crops alongside. The Sindh Highways Department completed reconstruction in June 2015 and was funded by the Asian Development Bank.

Deadly Accidents

The Mehran Highway is a high volume traffic road, as it connects Nawabshah and Khairpur districts and offers a shortcut to and from Sukkur. Many heavy transport vehicles which are traveling from Karachi to Punjab, Khyber Pakhtunkhwa, Gilgit-Baltistan, and Azad Jammu & Kashmir and back, often use this two-lane highway to avoid the N-5 National Highway traffic or toll tax. Police personnel are deployed at highway entrance points to stop high tonnage vehicles from entering but they, instead, take bribes and allow the heavy vehicles to proceed. Due to those heavy vehicles and commuter buses and coaches passing through Mehran highway many deadly accidents have taken place in the past few years.

On 20 August 2013, a passenger bus from Uch Sharif (Bahawalpur) overturned in Thari Mirwah, killing 6 passengers.

On 24 August 2014 a passenger bus traveling southbound from Punjab to Karachi collided at with a van traveling northbound to Thari Mirwah at Kot Lalu killing 10 passengers and injuring 11 others. All deceased were residents of Thari Mirwah.

On 25 March 2015, a Karachi-bound coach from Sadiqabad collided head-on with a Punjab-bound truck near Sui-Gas bus stop on the highway, resulting in the death of at least 16 people and injury of 20.

On 6 July 2018, at least 15 people were killed and 25 injured when a Punjab-bound coach from Karachi, a van and a car collided near Daur town.

In another tragic incident, six people including five schoolchildren were crushed to death by a passenger van, on 29 March 2021, near Kot Lalu.

See also

Provincial Highways of Sindh
Transport in Pakistan

References

External links
 Mehran Hwy Pakistan
 Distance from Kumb-Nawabshah
 

Highways in Sindh
Roads in Sindh
Transport in Sindh